Fetească Albă is a Romanian - Moldovan white grape variety, mainly cultivated in the regions of Moldova and Transylvania in Romania and Republic of Moldova, as well as in the Hungarian wine region of Eger.

In Moldova, it uses the biggest area planted among local varieties – . This grape is used a lot for sparkling wine production, but also for varietal Fetească wine.

Synonyms
Fetească Albă is also known under the synonyms Baratik, Bulgarien Feteasca, Devcenco Hrozno, Devicii Belii, Dievcenske Hrozno, Dievcie Hrozno, Divci Hrozen, Fehér Leányka, Feniaska Belaii, Fetiasca Alba, Fetiasca Belii, Fetiaska Alba, Fetisoara, Fetjaska Belaja, Fetyaska, Fetyaska Belaya, Fetyaska Koroleva, Fetysare, Janyszölde, Jányszőlő, Kanigl Weiss, Lányszőlő, Leanicazea, Leanika, Leánka, Leány Szőlő, Leányka, Leanyszölde, Leányszőlő, Lyan Szölö, Mädchentraube, Medhentraube, Paparyaska, Parsaryaska, Pasareasca Alba, Pasarjaska, Peseryaska, Poama Fetei, Poama Fetei Alba, Poama Pasareasca, Roszas Leányka, Feteasca, Fetjaska, Leanyka, Varatik.

See also 
Fetească Neagră
Fetească Regală

References

White wine grape varieties
Hungarian wine
Moldovan wine
Grape varieties of Romania